Meggett can refer to:

 Dave Meggett, an American football player
 Meggett, South Carolina, USA